Soukous (from French secousse, "shock, jolt, jerk") is a genre of dance music from Congo-Kinshasa and Congo-Brazzaville. It derived from Congolese rumba in the 1960s, becoming known for its fast dance rhythms and intricate guitar improvisation, and gained popularity in the 1980s in France. Although often used by journalists as a synonym for Congolese rumba, both the music and dance associated with soukous differ from more traditional rumba, especially in its higher tempo and longer dance sequences. Notable performers of the genre include Franco Luambo and his band TPOK Jazz,  Papa Wemba, Sam Mangwana, Tabu Ley Rochereau, and Pépé Kallé.

History

1960s

In the 1950s and 1960s, artists began altering the popular dance style of Congolese rumba to have faster rhythms and more prominent guitar improvisation, as well as more pronounced African elements. Guitarist and bandleader Franco Luambo is credited with pioneering the genre alongside his band TPOK Jazz. Tabu Ley Rochereau and Dr. Nico Kasanda formed African Fiesta and transformed their music further by fusing Congolese folk music with soul music, as well as Caribbean and Latin beats and instrumentation. They were joined by Papa Wemba and Sam Mangwana, and classics like Afrika Mokili Mobimba made them one of Africa's most prominent bands. Congolese "rumba" eventually evolved into soukous. Tabu Ley Rochereau and Dr Nico Kasanda are considered the pioneers of modern soukous. Other greats of this period include Koffi Olomide, Tshala Muana and Wenge Musica.

While the rumba influenced bands such as Lipua-Lipua, Veve, TP OK Jazz and Bella Bella, younger Congolese musicians looked for ways to reduce that influence and play a faster paced soukous inspired by rock n roll. A group of students called Zaiko Langa Langa came together in 1969 around founding vocalist Papa Wemba. Pepe Kalle, a protégé of Grand Kalle, created the band Empire Bakuba together with Papy Tex and they too became popular.

East Africa in the 1970s
Soukous now spread across Africa and became an influence on virtually all the styles of modern African popular music including highlife, palm-wine music, taarab. As political conditions in Zaire, as the Democratic Republic of Congo was known then, deteriorated in the 1970s, some groups made their way to Tanzania and Kenya. By the mid-seventies, several Congolese groups were playing soukous at Kenyan night clubs. The lively cavacha, a dance craze that swept East and Central Africa during the seventies, was popularized through recordings of bands such as Zaiko Langa Langa and Orchestra Shama Shama, influencing Kenyan musicians. This rhythm, played on the snare drum or hi-hat, quickly became a hallmark of the Congolese sound in Nairobi and is frequently used by many of the regional bands. Several of Nairobi's renowned Swahili rumba bands formed around Tanzanian groups like Simba Wanyika and their offshoots, Les Wanyika and Super Wanyika Stars.

In the late 1970s Virgin records produced LPs from the Tanzanian-Congolese Orchestra Makassy and the Kenya-based Super Mazembe. One of the tracks from this album was the Swahili song Shauri Yako ("it's your problem"), which became a hit in Kenya, Tanzania and Uganda. Les Mangelepa was another influential Congolese group that moved to Kenya and became extremely popular throughout East Africa. About this same time, the Nairobi-based Congolese vocalist Samba Mapangala and his band Orchestra Virunga, released the LP Malako, which became one of the pioneering releases of the newly emerging world music scene in Europe. The musical style of the East Africa-based Congolese bands gradually incorporated new elements, including Kenyan benga music, and spawned what is sometimes called the "Swahili sound" or "Congolese sound".

1980s and the Paris scene
Soukous became popular in London and Paris in the 1980s. A few more musicians left Kinshasa to work around central and east Africa before settling in either the UK or France. The basic line-up for a soukous band included three or four guitars, bass guitar, drums, brass, vocals, and some of them having over 20 musicians. Lyrics were often in Lingala and occasionally in French. In the late 1980s and 1990s, Parisian studios were used by many soukous stars, and the music became heavily reliant on synthesizers and other electronic instruments. Some artists continued to record for the Congolese market, but others abandoned the demands of the Kinshasa public and set out to pursue new audiences. Some, like Paris-based Papa Wemba maintained two bands, Viva La Musica for soukous, and a group including French session players for international pop.

Kanda Bongo Man, another Paris-based artist, pioneered fast, short tracks suitable for play on dance floors everywhere and popularly known as kwassa kwassa after the dance moves popularized by his and other artists' music videos. This music appealed to Africans and to new audiences as well. Artists like Diblo Dibala, Jeannot Bel Musumbu, Mbilia Bel, Yondo Sister, Tinderwet, Loketo, Rigo Star, Madilu System, Soukous Stars and veterans like Pepe Kalle and Koffi Olomide followed suit. Soon Paris became home to talented studio musicians who recorded for the African and Caribbean markets and filled out bands for occasional tours.

In the 1980s, the fast tempo zouk style popularized by the French Antilles band Kassav' became popular across much of Paris and French Africa. In the 1980s and early 1990s, a fast-paced style of soukous known as kwassa kwassa, named after a popular dance, was popular. Today, soukous mixes the kwasa kwasa with zouk and Congolese rumba. A style called ndombolo, also named after a dance, is currently popular.

Ndombolo

The fast soukous music currently dominating dancefloors in central, eastern and western Africa is called soukous ndombolo, performed by Dany Engobo, Awilo Longomba, Aurlus Mabélé, Mav Cacharel, Koffi Olomide and groups like Extra Musica and Wenge Musica among others.

The hip-swinging dance of the fast paced soukous ndombolo has come under criticism on claims that it is obscene. There have been attempts to ban it in Mali, Cameroon and Kenya. After an attempt to ban it from state radio and television in the Democratic Republic of the Congo in 2000, it became even more popular. In February 2005, ndombolo music videos in the DR Congo were censored for indecency, and video clips by Koffi Olomide, JB M'Piana and Werrason were banned from the airwaves.

See also
List of Soukous musicians
Music of the Democratic Republic of the Congo
Musicians from the Democratic Republic of the Congo
Champeta
Calypso
Marrabenta

References

Bibliography

External links
 
 The Sound of Sunshine: How soukous saved my life
 Rare recording (1961) of rural finger style Soukous guitarist Pierre Gwa with home made guitar
 GuitOp81's Soukous Guitar site